Pratap Singh Patwal (born 8 December 1971) is an Indian football referee.

Biography
Pratap is originally from the town of Premnagar, Uttarakhand. He served in the Indian Navy before voluntarily retiring.

Refereeing career
Pratap is on the FIFA referees list and the Asian Football Confederation (AFC) Elite Refeering Panel for 2012. He has been a FIFA referee since 2009. He made his debut in an international match between India and Yemen in Pune in 2010.

Pratap is a member of the Uttarakhand State Football Referee Association.

In October 2012 he became one of three Indian referees to be offered professional contracts. The AIFF contracted Pratap from October 2012 to May 2013. He was awarded AIFF Best Referee Award for 2013 and best referee for 2013–14 I-League.

References

1971 births
Indian football referees
Living people